Bridget Boland (13 March 1913 – 19 January 1988) was an Irish-British screenwriter, playwright and novelist.

Life
Bridget Boland was born in London on 13 March 1913 to Irish politician John Pius Boland and Eileen Querin Boland ( Moloney). 

Boland was educated at the Convent of the Sacred Heart, Roehampton and at Oxford University, where she studied philosophy, politics, and economics, graduating B.A. in 1935. In 1937 she became a film writer. From 1941 to 1946 she served in the Auxiliary Territorial Service, producing plays for the troops to boost morale from 1943 to 1946.

Boland reflected on her life and work in 1987:

Works

Selected filmography
 Laugh It Off (1940)
 Gaslight (1940)
 Freedom Radio (1941)
 He Found a Star (1941)
 This England (1941)
 Prelude to Fame (1950)
 The Fake (1953)
 The Prisoner (1955)
 War and Peace (1956)
 Anne of the Thousand Days (1969)

Plays
 The Arabian Nights, produced 1948.
 Cockpit, produced 1948. In Plays of the Year 1, 1949. (Filmed as The Lost People)
 The Damascus Blade, produced 1950
 The Return, produced 1952 as Journey to Earth and 1953 as The Return. 1954.
 The Prisoner, produced 1954. In Plays of the Year 10, 1954
 Gordon, produced 1961. In Plays of the Year 25, 1962
 The Zodiac in the Establishment, produced 1963. 1963
 A Juan by Degrees, produced 1965. Adaptation of a play by Pierre Humblot.

Novels
 The Wild Geese, 1938
 Portrait of a Lady in Love, 1942
 Caterina, 1975

Other
 (with Maureen Boland) Old Wives' Lore for Gardeners, 1976
 Gardener's Magic and Other Old Wives' Lore, 1977
 At My Mother's Knee, 1978
 (ed.) The Lisle Letters: An Abridgement, 1983. Abridgement of the 6-volume edition edited by Muriel St. Clare Byrne

References

External links

1913 births
1988 deaths
Writers from London
British women novelists
British women dramatists and playwrights
20th-century British women writers
20th-century British novelists
20th-century British dramatists and playwrights
20th-century British screenwriters